The 2019 Big Easy Tour was the ninth season of the Big Easy Tour. It was the second season in which events received Official World Golf Ranking points.

Schedule
The following table lists official events during the 2019 season.

Order of Merit
The Order of Merit was based on prize money won during the season, calculated in South African rand. The top 10 players on the tour earned status to play on the 2020–21 Sunshine Tour.

Notes

References

2019 in golf
2019 in South African sport